D'Angelo Grilled Sandwiches is a chain of 83 neighborhood-style sandwich shops found throughout New England, in Massachusetts, New Hampshire, Maine, Rhode Island and Connecticut. Founded in 1967 in Dedham, Massachusetts, D’Angelo Grilled Sandwiches serves various kinds of grilled, hot and deli sandwiches, rice & grain bowls, lobster rolls, grilled topped salads, wraps and hot soups. Famous for its Steak & Cheese sandwiches, the company's grilled sandwich Number 9 was called “the finest fast-food sandwich in the land” in a Bloomberg News column.

History 

In March 1967, 21-year-old Brian J. McLaughlin and Jay Howland opened "Ma Riva's Sub Shop" in Dedham, Massachusetts. The name was later changed to Angelo Sub Shop, and the letter D was added around 1978, supposedly standing for "delicious." The name change was to avoid any confusion with Angelo supermarkets.  D'Angelo sold salads, Syrian pocket bread and sub sandwiches.  Their most popular sub was the Steak & Cheese sandwich.

D'Angelo owned Liberty Bakery which baked and delivered all the bread to each store. They also owned Progressive Foods distribution center which delivered all the food to each store every week. Later they added a USDA meat processing plant to shave the 50,000 lbs. of steak consumed each week.

Beginning in the mid-1980s, many of the D'Angelo locations were co-branded and the store footprints were reworked to include full service Steve's Ice Cream counters. After several years, the Steve's component was replaced with a new brand, Chip's.

In 1993 PepsiCo bought D'Angelo with the intent to grow the chain into a national brand alongside its other properties such as Taco Bell, Pizza Hut and Kentucky Fried Chicken; however, this plan never came to fruition. At the time the chain had 173 locations.

Pepsi eliminated D'Angelo's ice cream brand, Chip's, shortly after purchasing the chain. During the time it was owned by Pepsi, some restaurants replaced the Chip's ice cream add-on, with a full service Pizza Hut add-on. Later some locations would also integrate a Honey Dew Donuts add-on.

In August 1997, Papa Gino's Holdings Corporation, the parent company of Papa Gino's, acquired D'Angelo, from Tricon Global Restaurants (then known as PepsiCo Inc.'s Pizza Hut unit). At the time of the acquisition the sandwich chain had 203 locations.

On November 4, 2018, numerous locations were abruptly shut down as part of their parent company's bankruptcy.

In February 2019, the company, which includes its sister brand, Papa Gino's, was sold to Wynnchurch Capital and operates under the name New England Authentic Eats, LLC.(

In January 2020, industry veteran Tom Sterrett, who previously served as COO, was appointed president and CEO of New England Authentic Eats LLC, parent to D’Angelo and Papa Gino's.

On November 2, 2021, D’Angelo announced that it would be resuming expansion plans for the first time since it emerged from bankruptcy.

References

External links 
D'Angelo's Website
D'Angelo's Corporate Website

New England
Economy of the Northeastern United States
Regional restaurant chains in the United States
Fast-food chains of the United States
Restaurants established in 1967
Former PepsiCo subsidiaries
Fast-food franchises
Submarine sandwich restaurants
1967 establishments in Massachusetts
Companies based in Dedham, Massachusetts
1993 mergers and acquisitions
1997 mergers and acquisitions
Companies that filed for Chapter 11 bankruptcy in 2018